Rhombophryne testudo is a species of frog in the family Microhylidae. It is endemic to Madagascar.

Its natural habitats are subtropical or tropical moist lowland forests, plantations, and heavily degraded former forest. It is threatened by habitat loss.

References

testudo
Endemic frogs of Madagascar
Taxonomy articles created by Polbot
Amphibians described in 1880